Karyn Khoury is an American perfumer. She is Senior Vice President of Fragrance Development Worldwide for The Estée Lauder Companies. In 2012, Khoury was honored as one of the most influential fragrance developers of our time at the Visionaries Gala and Awards Ceremony by the Museum of Arts and Design in New York along with Sophia Grosjman.

Early career 
Karyn began her fragrance career at Norda (now part of Givaudan). Five years later she joined The Estée Lauder Companies where she became the manager for Aramis men’s brands. She was appointed to her current position as Senior Vice President of Corporate Fragrance Development Worldwide in 1998.

At The Estée Lauder, Khoury started working personally first with Mrs. Estée Lauder and then with Evelyn Lauder and Leonard Lauder on new fragrance creations and products

Fragrances 
Among the famous perfumes Khoury has developed are: 
 Estée Lauder Beautiful 
 Estée Lauder Knowing 
 Estée Lauder Pleasures (1996 FiFi Awards winner) 
 Estée Lauder The Private Collection in collaboration with Aerin Lauder 
 Estée Lauder Sensuous line
 Estée Lauder Wood Mystique 
 Estée Lauder Amber Mystique 
 Sean John Unforgivable Men and Unforgivable Women
 Sean John I Am King (2009 FiFi Awards winner)
 Clinique Calyx 
 DKNY Be Delicious 
 American Beauty Wonderful Indulgence 
 Coach Coach Signature and Coach Poppy 
 Tom Ford Black Orchid
 American Beauty Beloved (2009 FiFi Awards winner)
 Tommy Hilfiger Tommy and Tommy Girl
 Tom Ford Grey Vetiver (2010 FiFi Awards winner) 
 Tom Ford Private Blend Collection 
 Tory Burch Eau de Parfum 
 Daisy Fuentes Dianoche Love 
 Estée Lauder Modern Muse (2016 FiFi Awards winner)

References 

Living people
Perfumers
American people of Lebanese descent
American people of Italian descent
People from New York (state)
Estée Lauder Companies people
Year of birth missing (living people)